Covered Carriage Truck was a type of railway van with end doors used for moving motor cars or parcel traffic. Four wheeled CCT were banned from Motorail services in the mid-1960s. These vans were designed to be used for carrying motor cars in Motorail but the tight clearances inside the body of the van and closing/opening of the end doors took a lot of time and effort from staff. The vans were replaced by General Utility Vans (GUV) and car flats.

British Rail's Earlestown Works built 822 four-wheeled Covered Carriage Trucks; these were preceded by a prototype, number 94100, built at Doncaster. In addition, Doncaster Works rebuilt four former LNER passenger coaches as prototype bogie CCTs numbered 96200–96203.

References

British Rail coaching stock